The Diocese of Uruguaiana is a Latin Church ecclesiastical territory or diocese of the Catholic Church in Rio Grande do Sul state, Brazil. It is a suffragan diocese in the ecclesiastical province of the metropolitan Archdiocese of Santa Maria.

Its cathedra episcopal see is Catedral Senhora Sant’Ana, dedicated to St. Anne, in Uruguaiana.

History 
 Established on 15 August 1910 Diocese of Uruguaiana / Uruguaianenv(sis) (Latin), on territory split off from the then Diocese of São Pedro do Rio Grande (now Archdiocese)
 Lost territory repeatedly: on 25 June 1960 to establish Diocese of Bagé, on 22 May 1961 to establish Diocese of Santo Angelo, in 2001 to the Diocese of Santo Angelo.

Statistics 

Episcopal ordinaries
(all Brazilians and Latin rite)

 Hermeto José Pinheiro (12 May 1911 - 3 November 1941)
 Jose Newton de Almeida Baptista : 10 June 1944 (appointed) - 5 January 1954), next Metropolitan Archbishop of Diamantina (Brazil) (5 January 1954 – 12 March 1960); Archbishop-Bishop of Brasília (Brazil) (12 March 1960 – 11 October 1966), last Archbishop Military Vicar of Brazil (Brazil) (9 November 1963 – 21 July 1986), Metropolitan Archbishop of (see promoted) Brasília (Brazil) (11 October 1966 – 15 February 1984), first Archbishop Military Ordinary of Brazil (Brazil) (21 July 1986 – retired 31 October 1990), died 2001.
 Luiz Felipe de Nadal (9 May 1955 - death 1 July 1963)
 Augusto Petró (12 March 1964 - retired 5 July 1995), died 2008; previously Bishop of Vacaria (Brazil) (16 May 1958 – 12 March 1964) 
 Pedro Ercílio Simon (5 July 1995 - 16 September 1998), previously Coadjutor Bishop of Cruz Alta (Brazil) (24 October 1990 – 5 July 1995); next next Coadjutor Bishop of Passo Fundo) succeeding as (last Suffragan) Bishop of Passo Fundo (19 May 1999 – 13 April 2011), (see)promoted first Metropolitan Archbishop of Passo Fundo (13 April 2011 – retired 11 July 2012)
 Ângelo Domingos Salvador, Capuchin Franciscans (O.F.M. Cap.) (26 May 1999 - retired 27 June 2007), previously Titular Bishop of Selia (16 March 1981 – 16 May 1986) as Auxiliary Bishop of Archdiocese of São Salvador da Bahia (Brazil) (16 March 1981 – 16 May 1986), Bishop-Prelate of Territorial Prelature of Coxim (Brazil) (16 May 1986 – 17 July 1991), Bishop of Cachoeira do Sul (Brazil) (17 July 1991 – 26 May 1999) 
 Aloísio Alberto Dilli, Order of Friars Minor (O.F.M.) (27 June 2007 - 13 July 2016), next Bishop of Santa Cruz do Sul (Brazil) (13 July 2016 – date)
 José Mário Scalon Angonese (31 May 2017 – date).

It has had no auxiliary bishops.

See also 
 List of Catholic dioceses in Brazil

References

Sources and external links
 GCatholic.org - data for all sections
 Catholic Hierarchy

Roman Catholic dioceses in Brazil
Roman Catholic Ecclesiastical Province of Santa Maria
Religious organizations established in 1910
Roman Catholic dioceses and prelatures established in the 20th century
Rio Grande do Sul